Coleophora benestrigatella is a moth of the family Coleophoridae. It is found in Canada, including Ontario.

References

benestrigatella
Moths described in 1941
Moths of North America
Taxa named by James Halliday McDunnough